Cesana Pariol was the venue for bobsleigh, luge and skeleton during the 2006 Winter Olympics in Turin, Italy. The track, built for the games, is located in Cesana. The venue holds approximately 7,130 spectators, of whom 3,624 are seated.

Construction details

History
During construction of the track prior to the 2006 games, there was concern that the track would be completed in time for homologation. A archaeological find (a small part of a Roman ruins) during construction slowed progress until the remains were excavated (near the current Turn 11).

The track was completed on end of 2004. In January 2005, the FIBT and FIL held their homologation events at the track. The FIBT had no issue when they ran their events during the weekend of 21–23 January 2005. The following week, the FIL ran their events, and had several crashes. Included in the crashes were Austria's Wolfgang Linger (broken ankle and calfbone), Brazil's Renato Mizoguchi (medically induced coma), and the U.S. Virgin Islands' Anne Abernathy (collarbone). During the summer of 2005, discussions were held among TOROC (the organizer of the 2006 Games), FIBT President Robert H. Storey (Canada), and FIL President Josef Fendt (Germany) about refitting the track for safety reasons. An agreement was reached by all three, and turns 16 through 18 were modified as such. The track was finally modified in late 2005 in time for homologation. Test runs done by Italy's Armin Zöggeler in late October 2005 led to the track being homologated on 31 October 2005 after it had been approved by former German national team coach Josef Lenz and FIL track commission chair Klaus Bonsack.

Cesana Pariol is now part of the complex called Torino Olympic Park. Post-Olympic usage for the tracks includes bobsleigh and luge rides for the public.

In October 2009, problems with early refrigeration of the track led the Bob- und Schlittenverband für Deutschland in Germany to lend support of short-order auxiliary services for foreign teams on such short notice. Starting 16 October, Italy and Japan's teams trained at the track in Winterberg while Austria's team trained at Königssee's track.

The track was scheduled to host events in 2011-12, but was shut down due to economic costs. After pressure from the FIBT and FIL in early 2012, the track was scheduled to run in 2012-13 only to be shut down again. In October 2012, the track was ordered to be dismantled by Cesana officials. The 45 tons of ammonia was moved from the track's refrigeration for other uses within the Turin region.
However, during the 2014 Winter Olympics, President of the CONI, Giovanni Malagò, expressed the intention to ensure new investments to keep the track open.

Statistics

The venue includes a vertical drop of 114 meters from start to finish.

Championships hosted
 2006 Winter Olympics
 FIL European Luge Championships: 2008
 FIL World Luge Championships: 2011

Notes

References
 2006 Winter Olympics official report.  Volume 3. pp. 61–3.
 Canadian skeleton racer Lindsay Alcock's diary during 2005 FIBT homologation of Cesana Pariol for the 2006 Winter Olympics
 Discovery Channel.co.uk article on the track construction prior to the 2006 games
 FIBT.com profile - Click on video clip of this run from a bobsleigh perspective. Men's single luge start house is shown on the left at the start of the run while the women's singles and men's doubles luge entrance appears after the third turn.
 Schwab: "Act of international solidarity". at the Fédération Internationale de Luge de Course (19 October 2009 accessed 2 December 2009.)
 FIBT President Storey and FIL President Fendt: "Olympic Track Summitt" in Berchtesgaden at the Fédération Internationale de Luge de Course (6 June 2005 article accessed 2 December 2009.)
 2006 Olympic Track in Cesana Pariol homologated by FIL. at the Fédération Internationale de Luge de Course (31 October 2005 article accessed 2 December 2009.)
 Jubilee Congress awards 2011 World Championships to Cesana-Pariol. at the Fédération Internationale de Luge de Course (23 June 2007 article accessed 2 December 2009. Also mentions 2008 European championships.)
 FIL-Luge track profile
 Track manager Ferriani assures that "everything is done for safety". at the Fédération Internationale de Luge de Course (2 February 2005 article accessed 2 December 2009.)
 US Slider Tony Benshoff (Luge) describes parts of the track during a typical run.
 Executive Committee meets Torino's organisers for the Olympic Games. at the Fédération Internationale de Luge de Course (29 September 2004 article accessed 2 December 2009.)
 Torino Olympic Park listing of public bobsleigh rides.
 Torino Olympic Park listing of monobob rides.

External links 
 

Venues of the 2006 Winter Olympics
Defunct sports venues in Italy
Olympic bobsleigh venues
Olympic luge venues
Olympic skeleton venues
Bobsleigh, luge, and skeleton tracks